The Farmer's State Bank is a historic commercial building on Seller Street in New Blaine, Arkansas.  It is a long rectangular single-story masonry structure, built of cut fieldstone and covered by a flat parapeted roof.  The front facade has a single storefront, consisting of plate glass windows flanking a double-door entry, with large transom windows above all three elements.  Built in 1922, it is the sole surviving commercial building along what was once New Blaine's commercial downtown area.

The building was listed on the National Register of Historic Places in 2002.

See also
National Register of Historic Places listings in Logan County, Arkansas

References

Bank buildings on the National Register of Historic Places in Arkansas
National Register of Historic Places in Logan County, Arkansas
Buildings and structures completed in 1922
Buildings and structures in Logan County, Arkansas